Howard William Dill (July 11, 1934 – May 20, 2008) was a Canadian giant pumpkin breeder who patented a pumpkin seed variety called Atlantic Giant. Dill was known as "The Pumpkin King" and "The father of all pumpkins".

Dill grew pumpkin varieties for many years in the Annapolis Valley close to Windsor, Nova Scotia. He left school in grade 6 and taught himself plant genetics. Dill earned business from competitive giant pumpkin growers and ordinary gardeners from Thailand and Turkey.

He was given the title of "Pumpkin King" at this time. Atlantic Giant pumpkin seeds were first patented in 1979 by Dill, who then went on to set the world record, this event took place in 1980 with a  record.

Dill died in 2008 of liver cancer.

References

External links 
 

1934 births
2008 deaths
Canadian horticulturists
Deaths from cancer in Nova Scotia
Deaths from liver cancer
Farmers from Nova Scotia
People from Windsor, Nova Scotia